Celtic Woman: The Magic of Christmas, or simply The Magic of Christmas, is the thirteenth studio album, and eighth Christmas-themed, released by the group Celtic Woman.

The Magic of Christmas features the same four performers from the group's previous studio album, Ancient Land; lead vocalists Mairéad Carlin (in her final appearance on a Celtic Woman album), Éabha McMahon (in her final appearance as a member of Celtic Woman), Megan Walsh, and instrumentalist Tara McNeill. It is also the group's first original Christmas-themed studio album since 2012's Home for Christmas.

Track listing

Personnel
Per the liner notes:

Featured performers
 Mairéad Carlin – vocals
 Éabha McMahon – vocals
 Tara McNeill – fiddle
 Megan Walsh – vocals
Musicians
 Gavin Murphy – piano, celesta
 Kieran Leonard – drums, bodhrán, percussion
 Darragh Murphy – uilleann pipes, whistle
 Bill Shanley – guitar
 John Hunt – bagpipes

FILMharmonic Orchestra, Prague
 Adam Klemens – conductor
Kühn Mixed Choir
 Lenka Navrátilová – choir arranger
Production
 Gavin Murphy – producer, arrangements, orchestrations
 Méav Ní Mhaolchatha – vocal director
 Michael Manning – recording engineer
 Chris O'Brien – mixing engineer
 Graham Murphy – mixing
 Andrew Walter – mastering engineer
 Vitel Kral – engineer
 Michal Hradiský – assistant recording engineer

Charts

References

2019 Christmas albums
Celtic Woman albums
Manhattan Records albums